John Poupore (April 10, 1817 – July 12, 1896) was a Quebec lumber merchant and political figure. He was a Conservative Member of Parliament representing Pontiac from 1878 to 1882. He also represented Pontiac in the Legislative Assembly of the Province of Canada and the Legislative Assembly of Quebec from 1861 to 1874.

He was born in Edwardsburgh (Cardinal) in Upper Canada in 1817 and studied at Potsdam, New York. He later settled at Chichester, where his father became the first mayor. He established his own farm and operated a sawmill in the area. He also served as lieutenant-colonel in the Pontiac county militia. In 1861, he defeated Edmund Heath to become the representative for Pontiac County in the legislative assembly; he was reelected in 1863. He represented the county in the provincial legislative assembly from 1867 until he resigned in 1874. He also served as mayor of Chichester from 1866 to 1867. He was an immigration agent at Quebec City from 1876 to 1878, when he was elected to the House of Commons.

He died at Chichester in 1896 and was buried in Edwardsburgh.

His nephew and son-in-law, William Joseph Poupore, also represented Pontiac provincially and federally.

References

 

1817 births
1896 deaths
Members of the Legislative Assembly of the Province of Canada from Canada East
Conservative Party of Canada (1867–1942) MPs
Members of the House of Commons of Canada from Quebec
Conservative Party of Quebec MNAs
Mayors of places in Quebec